Pavel Uvarov can refer to:

 Pavel Uvarov (badminton) (born 1967), Russian badminton player
 Pavel Uvarov (pentathlete) (born 1971), Kyrgyzstani modern pentathlete